Roderick MacLeod FRSE (1754-1801) he was Principal of Kings College, Aberdeen 1800 to 1815.

Life

He was born in 1727 the third son of Christina and Donald MacLeod, Laird of Talisker, Skye. Roderick had three siblings. He studied at Aberdeen University graduating MA in 1746.

From 1749 he was Professor of Philosophy at Kings College, Aberdeen, In 1764 he was elected Sub Principal and after 36 years in this role was elected Principal in place of John Chalmers, holding this role until death.

In 1783 (on the day of its foundation) he was elected a Fellow of the Royal Society of Edinburgh but he is not listed as a Founder. Aberdeen University gave him an honorary doctorate (DD) in 1793.

He died on 11 September 1815. He is buried in the enclosed area to the east of St Machar's Cathedral in Old Aberdeen.

Family

In June 1780 he married Isobel or Isabella Christie (1760-1832), daughter of Dr Christie of Baberton. 

They had ten children, six of whom survived to adulthood. Most notable were Christian MacLeod who married Hugh Macpherson, Professor of Greek at King's College, Aberdeen; and Isabelle MacLeod who married Arthur Forbes son of Sir Arthur Forbes of Craigievar; Dr Roderick MacLeod (1785-1852) died in London.

Roderick's wife remarried after his death and had two further children.

Artistic recognition

His portrait is held by the Scottish National Portrait Gallery but is rarely displayed.

References

1754 births
1815 deaths
Alumni of the University of Aberdeen
Academics of the University of Aberdeen
Fellows of the Royal Society of Edinburgh